1250 Galanthus, provisional designation , is a dark background asteroid from the central regions of the asteroid belt, approximately 20 kilometers in diameter. It was discovered on 25 January 1933, by German astronomer Karl Reinmuth at the Heidelberg Observatory. The asteroid was named for the herbaceous plant Galanthus, also known as "snowdrop".

Orbit and classification 

Galanthus is a non-family asteroid from the main belt's background population. It orbits the Sun in the central main-belt at a distance of 1.9–3.2 AU once every 4 years and 1 month (1,488 days; semi-major axis of 2.55 AU). Its orbit has an eccentricity of 0.27 and an inclination of 15° with respect to the ecliptic. The body's observation arc begins at Heidelberg the night after its official discovery observation.

Physical characteristics 

Galanthus is an assumed carbonaceous C-type asteroid.

Rotation period 

In the early 1980s, a rotational lightcurve of Galanthus was obtained during a survey conducted by Richard P. Binzel at the McDonald Observatory, Texas. Lightcurve analysis gave a well-defined rotation period of 3.92 hours with a brightness variation of 0.28 magnitude. The period was confirmed from photometric observations by astronomers at the Palomar Transient Factory in October 2015, which gave a similar period of 3.918 hours and an amplitude of 0.22 magnitude.

Diameter and albedo 

According to the surveys carried out by the Infrared Astronomical Satellite IRAS, the Japanese Akari satellite and the NEOWISE mission of NASA's Wide-field Infrared Survey Explorer, Galanthus measures between 17.18 and 21.00 kilometers in diameter and its surface has an albedo between 0.04 and 0.06.

The Collaborative Asteroid Lightcurve Link adopts the results obtained by IRAS, that is, an albedo of 0.0500 and a diameter of 21.0 kilometers based on an absolute magnitude of 12.26.

Naming 

This minor planet was named after the herbaceous plant Galanthus, also known as "snowdrop". The official naming citation was mentioned in The Names of the Minor Planets by Paul Herget in 1955.

Reinmuth's flowers 

Due to his many discoveries, Karl Reinmuth submitted a large list of 66 newly named asteroids in the early 1930s. This list also contained a sequence of 28 asteroids, starting with 1054 Forsytia, that were all named after plants, in particular flowering plants (also see list of minor planets named after animals and plants).

References

External links 
 Asteroid Lightcurve Database (LCDB), query form (info )
 Dictionary of Minor Planet Names, Google books
 Asteroids and comets rotation curves, CdR – Observatoire de Genève, Raoul Behrend
 Discovery Circumstances: Numbered Minor Planets (1)-(5000) – Minor Planet Center
 
 

001250
Discoveries by Karl Wilhelm Reinmuth
Named minor planets
19330125